The banded elimia (Elimia fascinans) is a species of freshwater snail with an operculum, aquatic gastropod mollusks in the family Pleuroceridae. This species is endemic to the United States.

References

Molluscs of the United States
Elimia
Gastropods described in 1861
Taxonomy articles created by Polbot